The action of 4 September 1782 was a small naval engagement fought off the Île de Batz between a French naval frigate, and a Royal Naval frigate, . This battle was notable as the first proper use of a carronade, and so effective was this weapon that the French commander promptly surrendered just after the first broadside.

Action
On 4 September the 44-gun frigate  under Captain Henry Trollope, armed entirely with carronades, was off the French coast near the Île de Batz when a frigate was sighted. Having then chased the vessel, it turned out to be a French frigate, . The 1,063-ton Hébé was a new ship of the class of the same name whose armament consisted of 38 guns, 26 of which were 18-pounder long guns. It was commanded by the Chevalier de Vigny (uncle of Alfred de Vigny) and had on board 360 men. Hébé had left Saint-Malo on 3 September and was heading to Brest escorting a small convoy.

At 7:00 am, having arrived within gunshot of the French ship, the Rainbow commenced firing 32-pounder chase guns from the forecastle, which were returned by the frigate. One 32-pound ball shot away Hébés wheel and killed her second captain.

Vigny examined the fragments of the hollow carronade shot and concluded that if she was firing 32-pounders as chase pieces, she was actually a ship of the line in disguise. He fired one broadside, "pour l'honneur du pavillon" (the honour of the flag), and struck his colours. The surrender of Hébé after slight resistance was not surprising when taking into consideration the advantage provided by the unusual armament of the Rainbow.

Rainbow lost only one man killed and two slightly wounded. The French lost five killed, including the second captain, Yves-Gabriel Calloët de Lanidy, and several wounded out of a crew of 360 men.

Consequences
A council of war was met at Morlaix whereby the loss of a new frigate, with barely a fight, condemned Vigny to fifteen years in prison, the case of his rank and service being declared as unfit for service. The captured ship was immediately integrated into the Royal Navy as HMS Hebe. After being renamed HMS Blonde in 1805 it was finally broken up in 1811.

The new class would include  (1812),  (1817),  (1824), and a second HMS Hebe (1826).

References

Citations

Bibliography

External links

Conflicts in 1782
1782 in France
Naval battles of the American Revolutionary War
Naval battles of the American Revolutionary War involving France
Maritime incidents in 1782